Lycée Camille Claudel is a senior high school in Vauréal, Val-d'Oise, France, in the Paris metropolitan area.

References

External links
 Lycée Camille Claudel 

Lycées in Val-d'Oise
Cergy-Pontoise